Mashallah Amin Sorour (16 March 1931 – 9 October 2010) was an Iranian cyclist. He competed in the individual road race and team time trial events at the 1964 Summer Olympics.

References

External links
 

1931 births
2010 deaths
Iranian male cyclists
Olympic cyclists of Iran
Cyclists at the 1964 Summer Olympics
Place of birth missing
Cyclists at the 1966 Asian Games
Asian Games competitors for Iran
20th-century Iranian people